The second season of Jane the Virgin premiered on The CW on October 12, 2015 and ended on May 16, 2016. The season consisted of 22 episodes and stars Gina Rodriguez as a young Latina university student accidentally artificially inseminated with her boss' sperm, Rafael Solano (Justin Baldoni). In this season, after giving birth to Mateo, her and Rafael's son, Jane struggles with motherhood and her love life.

Cast and characters

Main
 Gina Rodriguez as Jane Gloriana Villanueva
 Andrea Navedo as Xiomara "Xo" Gloriana Villanueva
 Yael Grobglas as Petra Solano and Anezka
 Justin Baldoni as Rafael Solano
 Ivonne Coll as Alba Gloriana Villanueva
 Brett Dier as Michael Cordero, Jr.
 Jaime Camil as Rogelio de la Vega

Recurring
 Yara Martinez as Dr. Luisa Alver
 Bridget Regan as Rose Solano / Sin Rostro
 Michael Rady as Lachlan
 Diane Guerrero as Lina Santillan
 Azie Tesfai as Detective Nadine Hansen
 Priscilla Barnes as Magda Andel
 Brian Dare as Luca
 Brian Jordan Alvarez as Wesley Masters
 Max Bird-Ridnell as Milos Dvoracek

Guest
 Britney Spears as herself

Episodes

Ratings

Home media

References

2015 American television seasons 
2016 American television seasons